In mathematics, the regula falsi, method of false position, or false position method is a very old method for solving an equation with one unknown; this method, in modified form, is still in use. In simple terms, the method is the trial and error technique of using test ("false") values for the variable and then adjusting the test value according to the outcome. This is sometimes also referred to as "guess and check". Versions of the method predate the advent of algebra and the use of equations.

As an example, consider problem 26 in the Rhind papyrus, which asks for a solution of (written in modern notation) the equation . This is solved by false position. First, guess that  to obtain, on the left, . This guess is a good choice since it produces an integer value. However, 4 is not the solution of the original equation, as it gives a value which is three times too small.

Modern versions of the technique employ systematic ways of choosing new test values and are concerned with the questions of whether or not an approximation to a solution can be obtained, and if it can, how fast can the approximation be found.

Two historical types

Two basic types of false position method can be distinguished historically, simple false position and double false position.

Simple false position is aimed at solving problems involving direct proportion. Such problems can be written algebraically in the form: determine  such that

The method begins by using a test input value , and finding the corresponding output value  by multiplication:  . The correct answer is then found by proportional adjustment, .

Double false position is aimed at solving more difficult problems that can be written algebraically in the form: determine  such that

if it is known that

Double false position is mathematically equivalent to linear interpolation. By using a pair of test inputs and the corresponding pair of outputs, the result of this algorithm given by,

would be memorized and carried out by rote. Indeed, the rule as given by Robert Recorde in his Ground of Artes (c. 1542) is:

Gesse at this woorke as happe doth leade.
By chaunce to truthe you may procede.
And firste woorke by the question,
Although no truthe therein be don.
Suche falsehode is so good a grounde,
That truth by it will soone be founde.
  From many bate to many mo,
From to fewe take to fewe also.
With to much ioyne to fewe againe,
To to fewe adde to manye plaine.
In crossewaies multiplye contrary kinde,
All truthe by falsehode for to fynde. 

For an affine linear function,

double false position provides the exact solution, while for a nonlinear function  it provides an approximation that can be successively improved by iteration.

History

The simple false position technique is found in cuneiform tablets from ancient Babylonian mathematics, and in papyri from ancient Egyptian mathematics.

Double false position arose in late antiquity as a purely arithmetical algorithm. In the ancient Chinese mathematical text called The Nine Chapters on the Mathematical Art (九章算術), dated from 200 BC to AD 100, most of Chapter 7 was devoted to the algorithm. There, the procedure was justified by concrete arithmetical arguments, then applied creatively to a wide variety of story problems, including one involving what we would call secant lines on a conic section. A more typical example is this "joint purchase" problem involving an "excess and deficit" condition:
Now an item is purchased jointly; everyone contributes 8 [coins], the excess is 3; everyone contributes 7, the deficit is 4. Tell: The number of people, the item price, what is each? Answer: 7 people, item price 53.

Between the 9th and 10th centuries, the Egyptian mathematician Abu Kamil wrote a now-lost treatise on the use of double false position, known as the Book of the Two Errors (Kitāb al-khaṭāʾayn). The oldest surviving writing on double false position from the Middle East is that of Qusta ibn Luqa (10th century), an  Arab mathematician from Baalbek, Lebanon. He justified the technique by a formal, Euclidean-style geometric proof. Within the tradition of medieval Muslim mathematics, double false position was known as hisāb al-khaṭāʾayn ("reckoning by two errors"). It was used for centuries to solve practical problems such as commercial and juridical questions (estate partitions according to rules of Quranic inheritance), as well as purely recreational problems. The algorithm was often memorized with the aid of mnemonics, such as a verse attributed to Ibn al-Yasamin and balance-scale diagrams explained by al-Hassar and Ibn al-Banna, all three being mathematicians of Moroccan origin.

Leonardo of Pisa (Fibonacci) devoted Chapter 13 of his book Liber Abaci (AD 1202) to explaining and demonstrating the uses of double false position, terming the method regulis elchatayn after the al-khaṭāʾayn method that he had learned from Arab sources. In 1494, Pacioli used the term el cataym in his book Summa de arithmetica, probably taking the term from Fibonacci. Other European writers would follow Pacioli and sometimes provided a translation into Latin or the vernacular. For instance, Tartaglia translates the Latinized version of Pacioli's term into the vernacular "false positions" in 1556. Pacioli's term nearly disappeared in the 16th century European works and the technique went by various names such as "Rule of False", "Rule of Position" and "Rule of False Position". Regula Falsi appears as the Latinized version of Rule of False as early as 1690.

Several 16th century European authors felt the need to apologize for the name of the method in a science that seeks to find the truth. For instance, in 1568 Humphrey Baker says:

Numerical analysis

The method of false position provides an exact solution for linear functions, but more direct algebraic techniques have supplanted its use for these functions. However, in numerical analysis, double false position became a root-finding algorithm used in iterative numerical approximation techniques.

Many equations, including most of the more complicated ones, can be solved only by iterative numerical approximation. This consists of trial and error, in which various values of the unknown quantity are tried. That trial-and-error may be guided by calculating, at each step of the procedure, a new estimate for the solution. There are many ways to arrive at a calculated-estimate and regula falsi provides one of these.

Given an equation, move all of its terms to one side so that it has the form, where  is some function of the unknown variable . A value  that satisfies this equation, that is, is called a root or zero of the function  and is a solution of the original equation.

There are many root-finding algorithms that can be used to obtain approximations to such a root. One of the most common is Newton's method, but it can fail to find a root under certain circumstances and it may be computationally costly since it requires a computation of the function's derivative. Other methods are needed and one general class of methods are the two-point bracketing methods.

Two-point bracketing methods

These methods start with two -values, initially found by trial-and-error, at which  has opposite signs. A point strictly between these two values is then selected and used to create a smaller interval that still brackets a root. In the improbable case that , a root has been found and the algorithm stops. Otherwise, the procedure is repeated as often as necessary to obtain an approximation to the root to any desired accuracy.

The point selected in any current interval can be thought of as an estimate of the solution. The different variations of this method involve different ways of calculating this solution estimate.

Preserving the bracketing and ensuring that the solution estimates lie in the interior of the bracketing intervals guarantees that the solution estimates will converge toward the solution, a guarantee not available with other root finding methods such as Newton's method or the secant method.

The simplest variation, called the bisection method, calculates the solution estimate as the midpoint of the bracketing interval.

Since the bracketing interval's length is halved at each step, the bisection method's error is, on average, halved with each iteration. Hence, every 3 iterations, the method gains approximately a factor of 23, i.e. roughly a decimal place, in accuracy.

The regula falsi (false position) method

The convergence rate of the bisection method could possibly be improved by using a different solution estimate.

The regula falsi method calculates the new solution estimate as the -intercept of the line segment joining the endpoints of the function on the current bracketing interval. Essentially, the root is being approximated by replacing the actual function by a line segment on the bracketing interval and then using the classical double false position formula on that line segment.

This line is a secant or chord of the graph of the function . In point-slope form, its equation is given by

Solving this equation for ck gives:

This last symmetrical form has a computational advantage:

As a solution is approached,  and  will be very close together, and nearly always of the same sign. Such a subtraction can lose significant digits.

This process is repeated until the root is approximated sufficiently well.

The above formula is also used in the secant method, but the secant method always retains the last two computed points, and so, while it is slightly faster, it does not preserve bracketing and may not converge.

The fact that regula falsi always converges, and has versions that do well at avoiding slowdowns, makes it a good choice when speed is needed. However, its rate of convergence can drop below that of the bisection method.

Analysis

Since the initial end-points
then one endpoint (the one where  also has the same sign) will remain fixed for all subsequent
iterations while the converging endpoint becomes updated.  As a result,
unlike the bisection method, the width of the bracket does not tend to
zero (unless the zero is at an inflection point around which ).
does not improve as rapidly as possible.

One example of this phenomenon is the function 

on the initial bracket
[−1,1].  The left end, −1, is never replaced (it does not change at first and after the first three iterations,  is negative on the interval) and thus the width
of the bracket never falls below 1.  Hence, the right endpoint approaches 0 at
a linear rate (the number of accurate digits grows linearly, with a rate of convergence of 2/3).

The method of bisection avoids this hypothetical convergence problem.

Improvements in regula falsi
Though regula falsi always converges, usually considerably faster than bisection, there are situations that can slow its convergence – sometimes to a prohibitive degree. That problem isn't unique to regula falsi: Other than bisection, all of the numerical equation-solving methods can have a slow-convergence or no-convergence problem under some conditions. Sometimes, Newton's method and the secant method diverge instead of converging – and often do so under the same conditions that slow regula falsi's convergence.

But, though regula falsi is one of the best methods, and even in its original un-improved version would often be the best choice; for example, when Newton's isn't used because the derivative is prohibitively time-consuming to evaluate, or when Newton's and Successive-Substitutions have failed to converge.

Regula falsi's failure mode is easy to detect: The same end-point is retained twice in a row. The problem is easily remedied by picking instead a modified false position, chosen to avoid slowdowns due to those relatively unusual unfavorable situations. A number of such improvements to regula falsi have been proposed; two of them, the Illinois algorithm and the Anderson–Björk algorithm, are described below.

The Illinois algorithm
The Illinois algorithm halves the -value of the retained end point in the next estimate computation when the new -value (that is)) has the same sign as the previous one), meaning that the end point of the previous step will be retained. Hence:

or

down-weighting one of the endpoint values to force the next  to occur on that side of the function. The factor ½ used above looks arbitrary, but it guarantees superlinear convergence (asymptotically, the algorithm will perform two regular steps after any modified step, and has order of convergence 1.442). There are other ways to pick the rescaling which give even better superlinear convergence rates.

The above adjustment to regula falsi is called the Illinois algorithm by some scholars. Ford (1995) summarizes and analyzes this and other similar superlinear variants of the method of false position.

Anderson–Björck algorithm
In this case, the new bracketing interval  and the left-hand endpoint has been retained.
(So far, that's the same as ordinary Regula Falsi and the Illinois algorithm.)

For simple roots, Anderson–Björck performs very well in practice.

ITP method 

Given ,   and   where  is the golden ration , in each iteration   the ITP method calculates the point  following three steps:

 [Projection Step] Project the estimator to minmax interval:  where .

The value of the function  on this point is queried, and the interval is then reduced to bracket the root by keeping the sub-interval with function values of opposite sign on each end. This three step procedure guarantees that the minmax properties of the bisection method are enjoyed by the estimate as well as the superlinear convergence of the secant method. And, is observed to outperform both bisection and interpolation based methods under smooth and non-smooth functions.

Practical considerations

When solving one equation, or just a few, using a computer, the bisection method is an adequate choice. Although bisection isn't as fast as the other methods—when they're at their best and don't have a problem—bisection nevertheless is guaranteed to converge at a useful rate, roughly halving the error with each iteration – gaining roughly a decimal place of accuracy with every 3 iterations.

For manual calculation, by calculator, one tends to want to use faster methods, and they usually, but not always, converge faster than bisection. But a computer, even using bisection, will solve an equation, to the desired accuracy, so rapidly that there's no need to try to save time by using a less reliable method—and every method is less reliable than bisection.

An exception would be if the computer program had to solve equations very many times during its run. Then the time saved by the faster methods could be significant.

Then, a program could start with Newton's method, and, if Newton's isn't converging, switch to regula falsi, maybe in one of its improved versions, such as the Illinois or Anderson–Björck versions. Or, if even that isn't converging as well as bisection would, switch to bisection, which always converges at a useful, if not spectacular, rate.

So, under those favorable conditions, one could switch to Newton's method if one wanted the error to be very small and wanted very fast convergence.

Example: growth of bulrush

In Chapter 7 of The Nine Chapters, a root finding problem can be translated to modern language as follows:
Excess And Deficit Problem #11:
 A bulrush grew 3 units on its first day. At the end of each day, the plant is observed to have grown by 1/2 of the previous day's growth.
 A club-rush grew 1 unit on its first day. At the end of each day, the plant has grown by 2 times as much as the previous day's growth.
 Find the time [in fractional days] that the club-rush becomes as tall as the bulrush.
Answer:  days; the height is  units.

Explanation:
 Suppose it is day 2. The club-rush is shorter than the bulrush by 1.5 units.
 Suppose it is day 3. The club-rush is taller than the bulrush by 1.75 units. ∎

To understand this, we shall model the heights of the plants on day n (n = 1, 2, 3...) after a geometric series.

Bulrush
Club-rush

For the sake of better notations, let .

Now, use regula falsi to find the root of 

Set  and compute  which equals  (the "deficit").
Set  and compute  which equals  (the "excess").

Estimated root (1st iteration):

Example code

This example program, written in the C programming language, is an example of the Illinois algorithm.
To find the positive number  where , the equation is transformed into a root-finding form .

#include <stdio.h>
#include <math.h>

double f(double x) {
   return cos(x) - x*x*x;
}
/* a,b: endpoints of an interval where we search
   e: half of upper bound for relative error
   m: maximal number of iteration
*/
double FalsiMethod(double (*f)(double), double a, double b, double e, int m) {
   double c, fc;
   int n, side = 0;
   /* starting values at endpoints of interval */
   double fa = f(a);
   double fb = f(b);

   for (n = 0; n < m; n++) {
      c = (fa * b - fb * a) / (fa - fb);
      if (fabs(b - a) < e * fabs(b + a))
         break;
      fc = f(c);

      if (fc * fb > 0) {
         /* fc and fb have same sign, copy c to b */
         b = c; fb = fc;
         if (side == -1)
            fa /= 2;
         side = -1;
      } else if (fa * fc > 0) {
         /* fc and fa have same sign, copy c to a */
         a = c; fa = fc;
         if (side == +1)
            fb /= 2;
         side = +1;
      } else {
         /* fc * f_ very small (looks like zero) */
         break;
      }
   }
   return c;
}

int main(void) {
   printf("%0.15f\n", FalsiMethod(&f, 0, 1, 5E-15, 100));
   return 0;
}

After running this code, the final answer is approximately
0.865474033101614.

See also
 ITP method, a variation with guaranteed minmax and superlinear convergence
Ridders' method, another root-finding method based on the false position method
 Brent's method

References

Further reading

 (On a previously unpublished treatise on Double False Position in a medieval Arabic manuscript.) 

Root-finding algorithms
Latin words and phrases
Articles with example C code